The Evektor EV-55 Outback is a twin-engine turboprop aircraft designed and built in the Czech Republic by Evektor-Aerotechnik. The prototype first flew on 24 June 2011.  The project's development was suspended in March 2017.

Development
In 2004 the company announced its plan to design and construct a two-engined utility aircraft that would carry up to 14 passengers or 4000 lb (1800 kg) of cargo, and operate from unimproved fields and at high-altitude airports.

The first prototype, an EV-55M (military version), flew from Kunovice Airport in June 2011, with company pilot Josef Charvat and military pilot Maj. Jiri Hana at the controls.
It was estimated at $2.1 to $2.2 million in 2012.
The first production-conforming aircraft flew from Kunovice in April 2016.

In June 2018, its price was $4 million and two aircraft should finish development flights with 200 hours in 2016, for 500 total hours.
Evektor secured enough investment to complete the certification process scheduled for 2017, with a minority investment from a Malaysian company backed by the country's former premier Mahathir bin Mohamad, but not to begin full production.

The project's development was suspended on 16 March 2017 due to "some uncertainties" with Evektor's Malaysian investor.

By December 2018, it was touted as a basis for an EVE-55 hybrid electric aircraft conversion to fly in 2020, with only one PT6A-21 running a  generator in the rear compartment, for much lower noise, an 18% fuel saving and the same payload and performance: a 3 hours endurance and 40 minutes from electric power only.

Design
The EV-55 is of conventional high-wing utility design with a T-tail. The prototype aircraft is powered by Pratt & Whitney PT6A-21 turboprop engines (535 shaft horsepower), driving four-blade propellers. The wing is mounted atop a nearly-square fuselage, which has five windows per side. The trailing-link tricycle landing gear retracts into the nose section or pods on the lower fuselage. Expected maximum cruise speed is 220 knots (407 km/h).

With nine passengers, range is 800nm (1,480km), it can take-off in 410m and land in 520m and with more speed, range and short take-off and landing capability, it can replace ageing piston-twins like the Cessna 421 and Britten-Norman Islander, or the smaller Cessna Caravan single turboprop when the payload-range of a larger turboprop such as the L-410 or Viking Twin Otter is not needed.
The less expensive, unpressurised EV-55 won't compete with the Pilatus PC-12 or Beechcraft King Air. 

The 5.02m x 1.61m cabin standard layout is five and four seats with a cargo compartment separated by a semi bulkhead and a L-410 sized double door at the rear.
It is equipped with a full glass cockpit, Czech firm Avia makes the four-blade propellers and Aero Vodochody the landing gear.

Specifications (EV-55)

See also

References

External links

 

2010s Czech civil utility aircraft
High-wing aircraft
Outback
Aircraft first flown in 2011
Twin-turboprop tractor aircraft